The 1906 Svenska Mästerskapet was the eleventh season of Svenska Mästerskapet, the football Cup to determine the Swedish champions. Örgryte IS won the tournament by defeating Djurgårdens IF in the final with a 4–3 score.

Quarter-finals

Semi-finals

Final

References 

Print

1906
Svenska
Mas